In computing, a keyboard shortcut is a sequence or combination of keystrokes on a computer keyboard which invokes commands in software.

Most keyboard shortcuts require the user to press a single key or a sequence of keys one after the other. Other keyboard shortcuts require pressing and holding several keys simultaneously (indicated in the tables below by the + sign). Keyboard shortcuts may depend on the keyboard layout.

Comparison of keyboard shortcuts 

Keyboard shortcuts are a common aspect of most modern operating systems and associated software applications. Their use is pervasive enough that some users consider them an important element of their routine interactions with a computer. Whether used as a matter of personal preference or for adaptive technology, the pervasiveness of common conventions means that a meaningful comparison of keyboard shortcuts can be made across various widely used operating systems.

General shortcuts 
Whether such commands are implemented (or not) depends on how an actual application program (such as an editor) is written. Not all applications follow (all of) these conventions, so if it doesn't work, it isn't compatible.

Some of the combinations are not true for localized versions of operating systems. For example, in a non-English version of Windows, the Edit menu is not always bound to the  shortcut.

Some software (such as KDE) allow their shortcuts to be changed, and the below list contains the defaults.

Navigation

Power management

Screenshots

Text editing 

Text formatting

Browsers / Go menu

Web browsers

Tab management

Window management

User interface navigation (widgets and controls)

Command line shortcuts 
Below is a list of common keyboard shortcuts that are used in a command line environment.

Accessibility 
 In Windows, it is possible to disable these shortcuts using the Accessibility or Ease of Access control panel.
 In GNOME, these shortcuts are possible, if Universal Access is enabled on the system.

See also 
 Keyboard shortcut
 Microsoft Windows key shortcuts
 Common User Access (CUA)
 Computer keyboard
 Human interface guidelines
 Pointing device gesture

Notes

References

External links 
 macOS
 Mac keyboard shortcuts
 Keyboard shortcuts in Safari for Mac
 Windows
 Keyboard shortcuts in Windows
 ChromeOS
 Chromebook keyboard shortcuts
 Linux
 GNOME
 Useful Keyboard Shortcuts
 Keyboard Navigation
 Set Keyboard Shortcuts
 Universal Access
 Usage
 Keyboard Interaction
 library.gnome.org for the latest documentation of unstable
 KDE
 KDE Fundamentals: Common Keyboard Shortcuts
 KDE Community Wiki: KDE Visual Design Group/HIG/Keyboard Shortcuts
 Office Suites
 Apache OpenOffice or LibreOffice
 OpenOffice.org and LibreOffice keyboard shortcuts
 Web Browsers
 Chrome or Chromium: Google Chrome keyboard shortcuts
 Firefox: Firefox browser keyboard shortcuts
 Opera: Opera browser keyboard shortcuts

User interface techniques